Omar Akhun is a Uyghur composer and musical performer best known for his Muqam melodies, often composing in 12 muqams. He and Turdi Akhun in the 1950s recorded songs using this form and made it more systematic.

References

Uyghur people
Uyghur music
Living people
Year of birth missing (living people)